Shona Kathryn Fraser (born 9 July 1975 in Newcastle, England) is a music journalist in Germany, the United Kingdom, and France, having worked for the BBC, MTV, and WDR. She was a judge on Deutschland sucht den Superstar, the German version of Pop Idol, and also represented Germany as a judge on World Idol.

References

External links
Shona Fraser discussion

1975 births
Living people
English music journalists
English women non-fiction writers
British women journalists
20th-century English women writers
20th-century British non-fiction writers
Women writers about music